Phlox dolichantha is a species of phlox known by the common name Big Bear Valley phlox. It is endemic to San Bernardino County, California, where it is limited to the area around Big Bear Lake in the San Bernardino Mountains. It grows in forests and the unique local pebble plain habitat. It occurs at elevations over 2000 meters. It is an erect, branching perennial herb growing up to 30 centimeters tall. The linear or narrowly lance-shaped leaves are 2 to 5 centimeters long and are oppositely arranged on the slender stems. The inflorescence is made up of one or more showy flowers at the tip of the stem. Each flower has a very slender tubular throat up to 5 centimeters long which can be white, pink, or lavender.

The flowers are pollinated by a variety of insects including the hawkmoth Hyles lineata and flies of the genera Anthomyia and Tachypeza.

References

External links
 Calflora Database: Phlox dolichantha (Big Bear Valley phlox)
 Jepson Manual eFlora treatment of Phlox dolichantha
NatureServe.org: Phlox dolichantha
UC CalPhotos gallery of Phlox dolichantha—Big Bear Valley phlox

dolichantha
Endemic flora of California
~
Natural history of San Bernardino County, California
~
~